La Sierra (Spanish for "the mountain range") may refer to:

La Sierra (film)
Rancho La Sierra (Sepulveda), a Mexican land grant including the present-day city of Norco and western end of the city of Riverside
La Sierra, California
La Sierra Academy, a Seventh-day Adventist K-12 school
La Sierra High School, a public high school
La Sierra University
Riverside – La Sierra station
Rancho La Sierra (Yorba), a Mexican land grant including the present-day city of Corona
La Sierra, Encrucijada, Cuba

See also
Sierra (disambiguation)